Zara Maria Larsson (born 16 December 1997) is a Swedish pop singer. In 2008, at the age of 10, she won the second season of the talent show Talang, the Swedish version of the Got Talent format. Since then she has received recognition with singles including "Lush Life" (2015), "Never Forget You" (2015), "Girls Like" (2016) featuring Tinie Tempah and "Ain't My Fault" (2016). She later featured on Clean Bandit's single, "Symphony" (2017), topping the charts in the UK and Sweden. Her third studio album in 2021 was preceded by the international hit "Ruin My Life" (2018).

Earlier in 2012, Larsson had signed with the record label TEN Music Group and subsequently released her debut extended play Introducing in January 2013. The EP was supported by Larsson's first original single, "Uncover", which topped the music charts in Scandinavia and was certified 6x platinum in Sweden.

Following her early success in Scandinavia and the release of her debut album, 1 (2014), Larsson signed a three-year contract with Epic Records in the United States. In 2016, Larsson performed at the opening and closing ceremonies for UEFA Euro in France. Larsson's second studio album, So Good, was released in March 2017. The album was supported by eight singles, including "Lush Life", "Never Forget You", and "Ain't My Fault", all of which reached number one in Sweden, with the latter debuting atop the chart. She would later be featured on Clean Bandit's single, "Symphony", which topped the charts in the UK and Sweden. Her third studio album, Poster Girl (2021), was preceded by the international hit "Ruin My Life" (2018) debuting in the Top 10 in Sweden, Ireland and the UK while receiving a Gold certification or higher in ten countries.

Early life
Zara Maria Larsson was born at Karolinska University Hospital in Solna, Stockholm, to Agnetha and Anders Larsson. In an interview with Svenska Dagbladet, she said that she was born "dead" due to a lack of oxygen from nuchal cord. Larsson grew up in Tallkrogen in Enskede, south of Stockholm. Her mother is a nurse and her father is an officer. She has a sister, Hanna, who is three years younger and is a singer and member of the band Lennix.

She has cited Carola Häggkvist and Whitney Houston as early inspirations. She has said that since the age of five, she knew that she wanted to become "immortal" like Elvis Presley.

Her first primary school was the Gubbängsskolan; she transferred to the Royal Swedish Ballet School in third grade. She attended the secondary school Kulturama, an art school in Stockholm.

Career

2008–2011: Career beginnings

Larsson won the 2008 season of Talang, the Swedish adaptation of Got Talent, at the age of 10, winning 500,000 kronor. "My Heart Will Go On", the song she sang in the final, originally sung by Celine Dion, was later released that year as Larsson's debut single, charting at the official Swedish Singles Chart, Sverigetopplistan, for six consecutive weeks and peaking there at number seven for one week.

Between December 2009 and January 2010, Zara participated in a reality TV series called Jag ska bli stjärna (English: "I shall become a star") where she and other young Swedish talents got help on the difficult road to international fame and success. She was managed by Laila Bagge, and they flew to Los Angeles in the United States where they visited and talked with Disney and the three big record label companies—Universal Music Group, Sony Music, and Warner Music Group—but she did not get a contract offer anywhere, which Zara later attributed to her age at that time.

2012–2014: Commercial success with 1

Larsson signed with TEN Music Group in 2012 to record her debut compilation recording. The recording, the extended play (EP) Introducing, was leaked on 9 December 2012 through an unofficial music video of "Uncover" on YouTube, a static-view video featuring her singing the whole song in the recording studio in one whole continuous take. The five-song EP was released in Scandinavia on 21 January 2013, consisting exclusively of original songs. "Uncover" was released as the EP's lead single. It peaked at number one on both the Sverigetopplistan and DigiListan charts, as well as reaching number one in Norway and peaking at number three in Denmark, and by 25 February 2013, the song was certified platinum in Sweden by Universal Music Sweden as a result of the song having received over five million streams. The song entered the Svensktoppen track lists. In July 2013, at Sommarkrysset in Gröna Lund, she received a 3× platinum award for Introducing for selling over 120,000 copies in Sweden.

On 27 March 2013, Larsson's next EP was revealed through a music video of "She's Not Me (Pt. 1)" on YouTube. The five-song EP, Allow Me to Reintroduce Myself, was released in Scandinavia on 5 July 2013. "She's Not Me" (consisting of "She's Not Me (Pt. 1)" and "She's Not Me (Pt. 2)") was released as a double-single on 25 June 2013. On 3 April 2013, Larsson revealed on her blog that she had signed a three-year contract with Epic Records in the United States. On 11 December 2013, Larsson performed at the Nobel Peace Prize Concert in Oslo. On 1 October 2014, Larsson released her Scandinavian debut studio album 1, including the songs "Uncover", "Bad Boys" and "She's Not Me" (Pt. 1 and Pt. 2), in Scandinavia. The version of "Uncover" in the album was a newer recording by Larsson from 2014. The album went platinum in Sweden. Larsson was an opening act for British singer Cher Lloyd's I Wish Tour.

2015–2017: So Good and international success

On 15 January 2015, Larsson released Uncover, her first international EP, containing songs from her album 1.

On 5 June 2015, Larsson released the single "Lush Life" from her upcoming second studio album. The song became her second number one single and was certified 4× platinum in Sweden. The song reached the top five in 18 countries and got certified platinum in 16 countries.

On 22 July 2015, Larsson released her collaboration with British singer MNEK, "Never Forget You", the second single from her upcoming album. The song reached number one in Sweden, number three in Australia, and number five in the United Kingdom. The song was certified platinum in Sweden after two weeks.

In February 2016, Tinie Tempah released "Girls Like" featuring Larsson. Larsson was later featured in the official song of UEFA Euro 2016, David Guetta's "This One's for You".

On 1 September 2016, Larsson released "Ain't My Fault", the third single taken from her upcoming album. On 22 October 2016, Larsson was named one of Times "30 Most Influential Teens of 2016". She released "I Would Like", the fourth single from her upcoming album, on 11 November 2016. It peaked at number two in the United Kingdom and at number four in Sweden.

In January 2017, Larsson released "So Good", featuring American singer Ty Dolla Sign. The single served as the fifth single from her second album of the same name, which was released on 17 March 2017 as her first international album. The album also features a collaboration with Wizkid titled "Sundown". "Symphony" by Clean Bandit featuring Zara Larsson was included as a bonus track and was released as a single on the same date and became Larsson's fifth number one single in her home country and first number one single in the United Kingdom. The album became her second number one album in Sweden and peaked in the top ten in Australia, Denmark, Finland, Netherlands, New Zealand, Norway and the United Kingdom.

On 12 May 2017, Larsson released a music video for "Don't Let Me Be Yours" as the sixth single from So Good, with "Only You" being released as the seventh single from the album on 11 August 2017.

2017–2022: Poster Girl

In September 2017, Larsson announced that she had started work on her third studio album, saying in an interview she had written two new songs with MNEK. On 11 December 2017, Larsson once again performed at the Nobel Peace Prize Concert, this time alongside American singer John Legend.

In January 2018, Larsson was named to Forbes "30 Under 30 Europe" list in the entertainment category.

In September 2018, Larsson announced the then lead single from her third studio album, "Ruin My Life". She released the song and music video on 18 October 2018. The track was commercially successfully worldwide, being certified at least gold in the US and the UK, while reaching number one in the Netherlands. In 2019, Larsson released the follow-up singles "Don't Worry Bout Me" and "All the Time", as well as the then promotional single "Wow".

In January 2019, she was featured on the song "Holding Out for You" by Italian rapper, singer and songwriter Fedez. On 8 November 2019, Larsson's next single, "Invisible", taken from the 2019 movie Klaus, the first original animated feature film released on Netflix, was released on the same day the film was released.

In March 2020, Larsson was featured on Kygo's single, "Like It Is", alongside American rapper Tyga. The song has performed moderately well, becoming a top-five song in Sweden, New Zealand, and Norway.

In June 2020, Larsson announced the single "Love Me Land" through Instagram. She released the song and music video on 10 July 2020. On the same day, an interview with her and Sveriges Radio was published. She announced that her new album would be released after 2020. She also said: "I am prepared in a completely different way. I have the next song ready, album cover, the video, the album is done. I just feel ready in a different way." It was then revealed on her Spotify page that the album would be called Love Me Land and that the title track was the first single from the album. However, Larsson later clarified in an interview that the album is titled Poster Girl and that "Wow" would also be included on the album, after officially announcing it as a single on 26 August 2020.

In September 2020, Larsson released a remix of "Wow" featuring American singer Sabrina Carpenter.

On 8 January 2021, she released "Talk About Love" featuring American rapper Young Thug as the third single from Poster Girl.

Poster Girl was released on 5 March 2021 to positive reviews. The album performed moderately commercially, debuting at number three on the Swedish Albums Chart, 12 on the UK Albums Chart, and 170 on the US Billboard 200.

On 21 May 2021, Larsson released a summer edition of Poster Girl. She also performed songs at a virtual party on Roblox to celebrate her new album.

On 22 April 2022, Larsson released "Words" with Swedish DJ Alesso. The song was a moderate success in Europe, reaching the top five in Sweden and the top 40 in Flanders, Croatia, Hungary, The Netherlands, Norway, Poland and the United Kingdom.

In June 2022, Larsson announced that she had left TEN Music Group to start her own record label named Sommer House and acquired ownership over her musical catalog in the process. She also renewed her contract with Epic Records with all future releases from then on being released under her own label Sommer House under exclusive license to Epic Records in the US and be distributed by Sony Sweden in Sweden.

2023: Upcoming fourth studio album
On 27 January 2023, Larsson released "Can't Tame Her", the lead single from her upcoming fourth (third international) studio album.

Personal life and other work
In 2015, Larsson got to plan and host a summer speech to be broadcast on Sveriges Radio, as one of 58 celebrities that year. The 48-minute speech was broadcast live on the P1 channel on 25 July 2015, at 13:00 CET. Her age at the time, 17, made her the youngest such speaker up until then, surpassing Robyn and Gina Dirawi at the age of 20. In the speech, she talked about her life, her music career, her feminist views, others' reactions to her, and her feelings about all of it.

Between 2017 and 2019, she was dating British model Brian H. Whittaker, whom she tweeted in 2015, but did not meet until two years later. Since 2020, Larsson has been in a relationship with Swedish-American dancer Lamin Holmén.

On 18 May 2017, Larsson released an H&M collection containing various different garments and accessories. She was involved in the creation process by making decisions about press, colors and fitting. Pink is the common color throughout the entire collection.

Views and activism 
Larsson has grown increasingly vocal with her views on other artists and industry workers with whom she works and admires. While she has high praise for performers such as Beyoncé, she is equal in her opposing views of such artists as Dr. Luke and Chris Brown. Larsson, a fan of Beyoncé, identifies as a feminist and models herself an "activist" after the singer. She attributes her openness of opinion on social media and in interviews to her parents, claiming: "Both my parents are very educated when it comes to social issues and being woke about what's going on in the world, and they've been very supportive of me having a voice".

In January 2015, Larsson gained a lot of positive attention in Sweden and the United States after posting a picture on her Instagram showing a condom wrapped around her leg and foot to refute the idea that penises can be too big for condoms to fit around. She is currently fronting a new campaign from Durex and AIDS organization (RED) promoting sexual health awareness and raising money for AIDS treatment in South Africa. In order to increase public understanding of incontinence, she has openly stated that she used diapers until she was seven years old.

In June 2015, she came into the spotlight in her home country for openly questioning whether the Bråvalla Festival had any gender perspective whatsoever, as its promotion and performance line-up were highly dominated by male artists. She also wondered why she wasn't presented among the main acts despite being the most popular artist on Spotify of the festival's acts. That same day, Swedish singer Günther wrote on his Facebook profile criticizing Larsson: "You are one of many teenybopper chicks who are world-famous in Sweden and maximally hyped but don't come with any hits, only a lot of fuss." During her performance at the festival she countered back saying: "Fuck Günther, fuck all woman haters". This led to the hashtag #backazara being created and popularised on social media platforms, where thousands of people, including famous Swedish people, showed their support for Larsson.

On 11 May 2021, Larsson posted an image of text on her Instagram where she criticised Israel for killing civilians and "upholding apartheid", and expressed the importance of standing against antisemitism.

In the 2022 Swedish general election, she publicly endorsed the Left Party.

Larsson has been referred to as a "man hater" when she tweeted "I hate all men" and "Man hating and feminism are two different things. I support both". She has later explained that she was purposefully amplifying Twitter's lack of nuance for extra controversy and also clarified her stance in more nuanced words after researching the subject by saying "Hating men is just hating toxic masculinity, essentially. And men hate that too, even if they don't know it, and even if they think they're against feminism. Even if they're like, 'No, I'm a strong man', it's like: yeah, but you hate that really – you know deep down that you wanna cry. You're really just a human being who sometimes needs a hug and love and comfort, but you can't tell your friends that because you think it would be 'gay' or emasculating or whatever.""

Huawei controversy 

In March 2019, it was announced that Larsson had started a commercial cooperation with Chinese technology company Huawei. Larsson's cooperation with Huawei was criticised by experts on human rights in China and others, who referred to Huawei's close ties to the authoritarian Chinese government and its record on human rights among other things. In August 2020, Larsson announced that she had ended her cooperation with Huawei. She said that China is "not a nice state" and that she does not stand behind its policies.

In response, Huawei stated that the endorsement deal was time-limited and had already ended in 2019. Larsson's music was reportedly taken down from Apple Music China after her views on the country were made public.

Artistry and influences
Larsson is a pop singer. She has experimented with electropop, house, and dance music. Additionally, she is influenced by R&B.

She has cited Beyoncé as her biggest musical influence. Larsson's Swedish influences include Robyn, Seinabo Sey, Sabina Ddumba and her sister Hanna, with her neo soul group Lennixx. Additionally, her international influences include Christina Aguilera, Rihanna, The Weeknd, Jay-Z, Ariana Grande, Jhené Aiko, and Lady Gaga. During her childhood, Larsson's mother listened to Whitney Houston, Etta James, Celine Dion and Aretha Franklin.

Discography

 1 (2014)
So Good (2017)
Poster Girl (2021)

Tours

Headlining 
 So Good World Tour (2017–2018)
 Don't Worry Bout Me Tour (2019)
 Poster Girl Tour (2021–2022)

Supporting 
 Cher Lloyd – I Wish Tour (2013–2014)
 Clean Bandit – North American Tour (2017)
 Ed Sheeran – ÷ Tour (2019)

Awards and nominations

Larsson is the recipient of numerous awards including four Grammis, four MTV European Music Awards and eight Rockbjörnen.

See also

 Popular music in Sweden
 List of artists who reached number one on the UK Singles Chart
 List of artists who reached number one on the U.S. Dance Club Songs chart

References

External links

 
  
 
 
 

 
1997 births
Living people
Universal Music Group artists
Epic Records artists
Singers from Stockholm
Musicians from Stockholm
Swedish child singers
Swedish women singers
Swedish pop singers
Contemporary R&B singers
Dance-pop musicians
English-language singers from Sweden
Got Talent winners
Feminist musicians
Swedish feminists
Talang (Swedish TV series) contestants
21st-century Swedish singers
21st-century Swedish women singers